The Chengdu Research Base of Giant Panda Breeding (or simply Chengdu Panda Base) is a public non-profit breeding and research institute for giant pandas, red pandas, and other rare animals. It is located in Chengdu, Sichuan, China.

Chengdu Panda Base was founded in 1987 by the Chengdu Municipal People's Government. It started with 6 giant pandas that were rescued from the wild. By 2008, it had 124 panda births, and the captive panda population has grown to 83.

Its stated goal is to "be a world-class research facility, conservation education center, and international educational tourism destination."

Partnerships
Chengdu Panda Base has partnered with many organizations in improving ways to conserve giant pandas. For example, its partnership with Zoo Atlanta helped the zoo secure the loan of 2 giant pandas. To date, these 2 giant pandas, Yang Yang and Lun Lun, have produced five off-spring: Mei Lan in 2006, Xi Lan in 2008, Po on November 3, 2010, twins Mei Lun and Mei Huan on July 15, 2013 and twins Ya Lun and Xi Lun on September 3, 2016.

Other research partners include:

Adventure World in Shirahama, Wakayama, Japan
East Bay Zoological Society, Oakland, California, United States
University of Liverpool, England, UK
National Institute of Health/National Cancer Institution, United States
National Zoological Park, Washington, D.C., United States
Nihon University, Tokyo, Japan
North of England Zoological Society, England, UK
The Oakland China Wildlife Preservation Foundation, California, United States
San Diego Zoo, California, United States
University of Japan
Edinburgh Zoo, Scotland, UK
Calgary Zoo, Calgary, Alberta, Canada
Zoo/Tierpark Berlin, Germany

On April 11, 2013, Chengdu Research Base of Giant Panda Breeding and CNTV reached an agreement on the establishment of iPanda.com after an official signing ceremony, and they immediately started preparing for the test launch (which was estimated in June, 2013).

See also
Captive breeding
Wolong National Nature Reserve
Giant pandas around the world

References

External links

1987 establishments in China
Buildings and structures in Chengdu
Organizations based in Chengdu
Tourist attractions in Chengdu
Giant pandas
Biological research institutes
Research institutes in China
Nature conservation in China
Zoos in China
Articles needing infobox zoo